Aguda Point, also variously known as Eclipse Point, Punta Natho or Punta Larga, is a point forming the east side of the entrance to Hidden Bay, on the northeast coast of Kyiv Peninsula, Graham Land. First charted by the Belgian Antarctic Expedition under Adrien de Gerlache, 1897–99. The name appears on an Argentine government chart of 1957 and is probably descriptive; "aguda" is Spanish for "sharp" or "sharp pointed".

References
 SCAR Composite Gazetteer of Antarctica.

Headlands of Graham Land
Danco Coast